Fitzsimons station is a Regional Transportation District (RTD) light rail station on the R Line in Aurora, Colorado. The station is located along the north side of Fitzsimons Parkway along Sand Creek Park and serves the University of Colorado Anschutz Medical Campus via a free shuttle bus.

The station opened on February 24, 2017, along with the rest of the R Line. It was originally planned to be located further south on Montview Boulevard, closer to the campus, but was moved in 2013 to prevent vibrations from affecting research equipment.

History

The station was one of two planned in 2001 on the former Fitzsimons Army Medical Center, an area that Fitzsimons Redevelopment Authority developed into a campus anchored by the then University of Colorado Health Sciences Center. The second planned for the former Fitzsimons Army Medical Center became Colfax station.

The R Line was approved as part of the 2004 FasTracks ballot measure, which planned to build a light rail line along Interstate 225 in Aurora. As part of the light rail line, a station at Fitzimons Commons near the Anschutz Medical Campus was planned along Montview Boulevard at Uvalda Street, and was initially named Montview.

In May 2013, the University of Colorado requested that the light rail station be moved off of its campus due to concerns that vibrations and electromagnetic interference generated by trains would interfere with research equipment. The proposed $20 million in mitigation would have included construction of a floating rail bed and replacement of new equipment in the research labs. On June 25, 2013, the RTD Board of Directors approved the realignment of the light rail line onto Fitzsimons Boulevard, with a new station north of the campus connected via a shuttle bus. The relocated station required the acquisition of land from Sand Creek Park, which underwent $3 million in renovations alongside light rail construction in 2015.

The station opened along with the rest of the R Line on February 24, 2017, several months after its scheduled opening due to construction delays.

Transit-oriented development

Fitzsimons station is located to the north of the Fitzsimons Life Science District and Fitzsimons Innovation District, a  transit-oriented development that surrounds the Anschutz Medical Campus. The city of Aurora plans to build housing, hotels and office space on the land between the station and medical campus, including redevelopment of the Fitzsimons Golf Course.

A park-and-ride garage was proposed at the station in 2013, but was not built with the station.

References

RTD light rail stations
Transportation buildings and structures in Aurora, Colorado
Railway stations in the United States opened in 2017
2017 establishments in Colorado